Amerila albivitrea is a moth of the subfamily Arctiinae. It was described by George Hampson in 1901. It is found in New Caledonia.

References

Moths described in 1901
Amerilini
Moths of Oceania